Ipek Yaylacıoğlu   (born 31 July 1984) is a Turkish actress from Istanbul. Her grandmother is of Bosnian descent.
She is best known for the Kardeş Payı comedy series, Arka Sokaklar, and Kavak Yelleri.

She starred in the TV series Senden başka and appeared in the movie Başka Semtin Çocukları.

Filmography

Film 
  Başka Semtin Çocukları, 2008

Television 
 Ihlamurlar Altında, 2005–2007
 Senden Başka, 2007
 Elif, 2008
 Çemberin Dışında , 2008
 Kavak Yelleri, 2009
 Arka Sokaklar, Third Pınar, 2009–2019
 Kardeş Payı, 2014–2015

References

External links

1984 births
Living people
Actresses from Istanbul
Turkish film actresses
Turkish television actresses